Koretzky is a surname. Notable people with the surname include:

 Clément Koretzky (born 1990), French cyclist
 Nicolas Koretzky (born 1972), French actor
 Victor Koretzky (born 1994), French mountain biker